Luís Henrique Silveira or simply Luís Henrique (born January 29, 1979 in Itu), is a Brazilian left back.

External links
CBF
paranaclube.com

1979 births
Living people
Brazilian footballers
Ituano FC players
Clube Atlético Juventus players
Associação Ferroviária de Esportes players
Clube Atlético Bragantino players
Paraná Clube players
Itumbiara Esporte Clube players
Association football defenders